The First European Political Community Summit was the inaugural meeting of the European Political Community held on 6 October 2022 in Prague, Czech Republic. It was attended by the heads of state or government of forty-four European countries. Russia and Belarus were not invited.

Aims
The stated aims of the summit were as follows:

To foster political dialogue and cooperation to address issues of common interest
To strengthen the security, stability and prosperity of the European continent

Schedule and agenda
The summit took place on 6 October 2022 and was structured as follows:
12.00 - Arrivals, doorsteps and welcome
13.00 - Opening plenary session
14.00 - Roundtable discussions on either peace and security or energy, climate and the economic situation
16.00 - Bilateral meetings
19.30 - Closing plenary session
21.45 - Press conference

The summit was followed by an informal meeting of the European Council which took place the next day also at Prague Castle.

Participants

 

The following heads of state/heads of government participated in the summit:

Outcomes

Future summits
According to a press release issued after the summit, the main focus of discussions was in regard to security, the 2022 Russian invasion of Ukraine and the ongoing energy crisis in Europe. It was also agreed that the following summit will be held in the spring of 2023 in Moldova and would focus on securing key infrastructure such as pipelines, cables, and satellites; stepping up the fight against cyberattacks, creating a support fund for Ukraine, working out a common, pan-European energy policy and looking into the possibility of having more university and student exchanges.

Armenia-Azerbaijan relations

At the summit, Armenian Prime Minister Nikol Pashinyan and Azeri President Ilham Aliyev met in an attempt to resolve the long running Nagorno-Karabakh conflict and the recent Armenia–Azerbaijan border crisis. Following the meeting, the two parties re-affirmed their commitment to upholding the United Nations Charter and the Alma-Ata Protocol, through which they recognize each other’s territorial integrity and sovereignty. They also agreed to the deployment of a European Union led mission to be deployed on the Armenian side of their shared border for a period of two months, starting in October 2022 with a view to build confidence and to contribute to the border delimitation process. This mission ultimately led to the deployment of a longer term European Union Mission in Armenia.

United Kingdom
At the summit, the United Kingdom agreed to re-engage with the North Seas Energy Cooperation (NSEC) which it had previously left in January 2020. At a fringe event, British Prime Minister Liz Truss committed to joining the Permanent Structured Cooperation (PESCO) and its Military Mobility programme. The summit also resulted in a resetting of the relations between the UK and France. During bilateral talks at the summit, Liz Truss and French President Emmanuel Macron reaffirmed the strong and historic ties between their two countries and the two agreed to hold a UK-France Summit in 2023. Prior to the summit, Truss had stated that "the jury was out" on whether Macron was a friend or foe, however during the summit Truss called Macron a friend.

See also 

 European integration
 Pan-European identity
 Politics of Europe
 2nd European Political Community Summit

Explanatory notes

References

External links
 Meeting of the European Political Community, 6 October 2022
 First Meeting of the European Political Community
 Post-Summit Media Briefings

European Political Community
Diplomatic conferences in the Czech Republic
2022 conferences
Foreign relations of the European Union
October 2022 events in the Czech Republic
2022 establishments in the Czech Republic
European integration
European Political Community
Pan-European organizations
2020s in Prague
21st-century diplomatic conferences (Europe)
2022 in international relations